Coccographis is a monotypic genus of beetles found in Laos and more generally in Southern Asia. It was first named by Lesne in 1901. Its only recognized species is Coccographis nigrorubra.

References 

Bostrichidae
Beetles described in 1901